The CANT 36 was a trainer developed in Italy in the 1930s. It was a conventional design with fixed tailskid undercarriage and accommodation for the pilot and instructor in tandem, open cockpits. Intended for advanced training, it was equipped with a powerful 187 kW (250 hp) engine. The single prototype was evaluated by the Regia Aeronautica, but when no purchase order was forthcoming, no further examples were built.

Specifications

References

 
 aerei-italiani.net

CANT 36
1930s Italian military trainer aircraft
Aircraft first flown in 1932
Single-engined tractor aircraft
Biplanes